The Società Italiana di Musica Moderna (Italian: Italian Society for Modern Music), an organization founded in 1917 by  Alfredo Casella, Gian Francesco Malipiero, and Gabriele D’Annunzio. The organization published a journal called Ars Nuova. Casella then abandoned the organization to found his own Corporazione delle Nuove Musiche (Corporation for New Music).

References

Italian music history
Music organisations based in Italy